Caroline is a town in Tompkins County, New York, United States. The population was 3,282 at the 2010 census.

The Town of Caroline is on the county's southeast border and is southeast of Ithaca.

History 
The area was first settled circa 1794 while the region was still part of Tioga County.  Caroline was part of the Watkins and Flint Purchase (1791).

The Town of Caroline was formed from the Town of Spencer (now in Tioga County) in 1811.

Notable person
Charles R. Gleason (1830-1907), Wisconsin businessman and politician, was born in Caroline.

Geography

The east and south town lines are the border of Tioga County.

New York State Route 79 crosses the town.

Demographics

As of the census of 2000, there were 2,910 people, 1,161 households, and 758 families residing in the town.  The population density was 52.9 people per square mile (20.4/km2).  There were 1,254 housing units at an average density of 22.8 per square mile (8.8/km2).  The racial makeup of the town was 92.85% White, 3.09% African American, 0.58% Native American, 0.86% Asian, 0.10% Pacific Islander, 0.38% from other races, and 2.13% from two or more races. Hispanic or Latino of any race were 2.37% of the population.

There were 1,161 households, out of which 33.2% had children under the age of 18 living with them, 50.9% were married couples living together, 9.3% had a female householder with no husband present, and 34.7% were non-families. 26.8% of all households were made up of individuals, and 7.8% had someone living alone who was 65 years of age or older.  The average household size was 2.46 and the average family size was 2.99.

In the town, the population was spread out, with 27.1% under the age of 18, 6.6% from 18 to 24, 28.5% from 25 to 44, 27.9% from 45 to 64, and 9.9% who were 65 years of age or older.  The median age was 38 years. For every 100 females, there were 98.5 males.  For every 100 females age 18 and over, there were 94.0 males.

The median income for a household in the town was $43,315, and the median income for a family was $51,983. Males had a median income of $35,375 versus $26,587 for females. The per capita income for the town was $21,531.  About 6.9% of families and 7.4% of the population were below the poverty line, including 7.6% of those under age 18 and 3.1% of those age 65 or over. The majority of the residents of the Caroline area commute to the Ithaca area.

The Town of Caroline is served by 4 school districts Ithaca (city), New York, Dryden (village), New York, Newark Valley (village), New York and Candor (village), New York. Caroline Elementary School serves the northern and central portions of the town. Brooktondale Baptist School, sponsored by Brooktondale Baptist Church, closed around 2002, although the parish community continues.

Communities and locations in Caroline 
Besemer (formerly "Besemer Depot") – A location on NY-79 in the northwestern corner of the town.
Brooktondale (formerly "Mott's Corner" and "Brookton") – A hamlet near the western town boundary.
Caroline – A hamlet on NY-79 at the northern town line.
Caroline Center (formerly "Centerville") – A hamlet centrally located in the town.
Caroline Depot – A hamlet in the northwestern part of the town and south of Brooktondale.
Guide Board Corners – A location south of Slaterville Springs.
Slaterville Springs (formerly "Slaterville") – A hamlet with a post office on NY-79, site of Caroline Town Hall. The District No. 2 School, Caroline and Dryden and St. Thomas Episcopal Church are listed on the National Register of Historic Places.
Speedsville – A hamlet in the southeastern corner of the town. The District Number 7 School and St. John's Episcopal Church are listed on the National Register of Historic Places.
West Slaterville (formerly "Boiceville") – A hamlet on NY-79 near the northern town line. It was the site of the first town meeting.
White Church – A hamlet in the southwestern part of Caroline.

Education
Students in the Town of Caroline are dispersed into several school districts: Dryden, Ithaca, Candor, and Newark Valley. A school located within the town is the Caroline Elementary School of the Ithaca City School District.

References

External links
  Town of Caroline, NY
 Town of Caroline Historian

Towns in Tompkins County, New York
Populated places established in 1811
1811 establishments in New York (state)